Cathcartia is a small genus of flowering plants in the family Papaveraceae, native to China, Nepal, the eastern Himalayas, and northern Myanmar. Chloroplast DNA evidence supports a split of Cathcartia from the blue poppy genus Meconopsis in an effort to resolve longstanding taxonomic difficulties in the Himalayan poppies.

Species
The following species are accepted:
Cathcartia chelidoniifolia 
Cathcartia oliveriana 
Cathcartia smithiana 
Cathcartia villosa

References

Papaveroideae
Papaveraceae genera
Flora of North-Central China
Flora of South-Central China
Flora of Southeast China
Flora of Tibet
Flora of Nepal
Flora of East Himalaya
Flora of Myanmar